Piergiorgio Bressani (10 June 1929 – 3 June 2022) was an Italian politician. A member of the Christian Democracy party, he served in the Chamber of Deputies from 1963 to 1986. He was also Secretary of the Council of Ministers from 1979 to 1981.

Bressani died in Udine on 3 June 2022 at the age of 92.

References

1929 births
2022 deaths
20th-century Italian politicians
Christian Democracy (Italy) politicians
Deputies of Legislature IV of Italy
Deputies of Legislature V of Italy
Deputies of Legislature VI of Italy
Deputies of Legislature VII of Italy
Deputies of Legislature VIII of Italy
Deputies of Legislature IX of Italy
Mayors of Udine